Cyrtolitidae is an extinct family of monoplacophorans in the order Cyrtonellida.

Genera 
 Cloudia
 Cyclocyrtonella
 Cyrtolites
 Cyrtonellopsis
 Kolihadiscus
 Neocyrtolites
 Paracyrtolites
 Quasisinuites
 Sinuella
 Sinuitopsina
 Sinuitopsis
 Telamocornu
 Yochelsonellis

References

External links 
 

Prehistoric monoplacophorans
Prehistoric mollusc families
Ordovician first appearances
Devonian extinctions